Windows Server 2022 or Windows Server 2022 Edition is the tenth and latest major long term servicing channel (LTSC) release of the Windows Server operating system by Microsoft, as part of the Windows NT family of operating systems. It was announced at Microsoft's Ignite event from March 2, 2021, to March 4, 2021. It was released on August 18, 2021, almost three years after Windows Server 2019, and a few months before Windows 11.

Windows Server 2022 is based on Windows 10 21H2, however, its updates aren't compatible with Windows 10. Like its predecessors, however, it requires x64 processors.

History 

On February 22, 2021, Microsoft announced Windows Server 2022 would release on March 2.

On March 3, 2021, Microsoft announced Windows Server 2022 would release as a preview build on Windows Update. Windows Server 2022 was launched for general customer availability on August 18, 2021.

In September 2021, Microsoft announced the release of SQL Server 2022 is set for March 2022.

In June 2022, Microsoft released optional "C" updates for users to test upcoming fixes for Windows Server 2022 (KB5014665). While these updates address connectivity issues when using Wi-Fi hotspots after installing Windows updates, there have also been reported issues with LLTP/SSTP VPN clients and RDP failing to connect after deploying these updates.

Features 

Windows Server 2022 has the following features:

Security 
 TPM 2.0
 Secured-core server; Credential Guard and Hypervisor-protected Code Integrity (HVCI).
 UEFI Secure Boot
 Boot DMA Protection
 DNS-over-HTTPS
 AES-256 encryption on SMB

Storage 
 Storage Migration Service
 Server Message Block (SMB) compression
 Storage security and performance

Cloud 
 Azure hybrid capabilities

Editions

Essentials 
Only available through Microsoft OEM partners. 
 Intended for small businesses 
 Supports a maximum of 25 users and 50 devices
 No client access licenses (CALs) required

Standard 
 Intended for physical or weakly virtualized environments
 Only two virtual machines and one Hyper-V host are usable.

Datacenter 
 Intended for highly virtualized data centers and cloud environments

Azure Datacenter 
 Designed for the Microsoft Azure platform

Hardware requirements

Minimum

References

External links
Windows Server live at Microsoft

Windows Server
X86-64 operating systems